Nancy Abigail Madden is an American psychologist who studies education.  She is known for the Success for All model of education.  She is a professor in the School of Education at Johns Hopkins University.  She is best known for her role in developing the Success for All educational model.

Education and career
Madden attended Reed College for her undergraduate degree, which she received in 1973.  She went on to American University for graduate studies, where she received her PhD in 1980, with a thesis titled Effects of Cooperative Learning on the Social Acceptance of Mainstreamed Academically Handicapped Students.  She has worked at Johns Hopkins University since 1980, and is a professor at the Center for Research and Reform in Education at that university.

Success for All

Together with Robert Slavin, Madden developed the Success for All model of reform for elementary and middle schools beginning in 1986, after being approached by the superintendent of the Baltimore school system for help with troubled inner city schools.  As of May 2005, the program was used in 1,300 schools in 47 states.  A meta-analysis of school improvement programs rated it favorably.  However, most teachers participating in Success For All, even ones who strongly support the program, have been found to make substantial changes in implementation in contrast to the expectations of developers.  Some teachers also reported that the program constrained their creativity and autonomy in their own classroom.

Personal life
Madden was married to her research collaborator Robert Slavin until his death in 2021.

Books

References

Reed College alumni
Johns Hopkins University alumni
Johns Hopkins University faculty
Living people
Year of birth missing (living people)

American women psychologists
American University alumni